Qiwllaqucha (Quechua qillwa, qiwlla, qiwiña gull, qucha lake, "gull lake", hispanicized spelling Quiullacocha) is a small lake in Peru located in the Huánuco Region, Dos de Mayo Province, Marías District.

References 

Lakes of Peru
Lakes of Huánuco Region